The Saint Catherine of Alexandria Polyptych (also known as Pisa Polyptych) is a painting by the Italian medieval artist Simone Martini, dating to 1320. Originally placed at the high altar of the church of Santa Caterina in Pisa, it is now housed in the Museo Nazionale di San Matteo of the same city.

The work is signed SYMON DE SENIS ME PINXIT in the central panel with the Madonna and Child. According to the original convent's annals, the polyptych was placed at the altar in 1320. It was thus completed by that year, having been likely begun in 1319.

Description
The polyptych is Martini's largest work, and includes numerous sub-panels. Aside from the seven main ones, there are 15 predella figures, an upper row with other 14 figures and seven cusps with other characters. There is a total of 44 figures.

The central panel depicts the Madonna with Child; the remaining six main panels are, from left to right, St. Dominic, St. John the Evangelist, St. Mary Magdalene, St. Catherine of Alexandria, St. John the Baptist and St. Peter of Verona. All these figures are enclosed within three foiled cusped arches. Above the Madonna are the two archangels Gabriel and Michael and, above them, the Blessing Christ. The six saints panel are surmounted by, also in couples, the Twelve Apostles, with the exception of St. John the Evangelist, replaced by St. Paul. 

The predella shows, at the center, Christ in the Sepulchre with the Madonna and St. Mark and further couples of saints which, from left to right, are Gregory and Luke, Stephen and  Apollonia, Jerome and Lucy, Agnes and Ambrose, Thomas of Aquino and Augustine, Ursula and Lawrence

Since the identification of the saints is controversial, the saints panels in the museum are placed differently from the image in this article.

References

1320s paintings
 
Polyptychs
Paintings of Jerome
Paintings of the Madonna and Child
Paintings depicting John the Baptist
Paintings depicting Mary Magdalene
Paintings in the collection of the Museo Nazionale di San Matteo
Paintings of Catherine of Alexandria